Jesper Skibby (born 21 March 1964 in Silkeborg, Denmark) is a retired professional road racing cyclist. He won at least one stage at each of the major tours. He was one of the most popular in Denmark, not only because of his talent, but also because of his wit and his constant banter.  He rode for the Dutch TVM from 1989 to 1997, but switched to the Danish team Team home - Jack & Jones in 1998, where he ended his active career in 2000.

Professional career

He participated in Tour de France 11 times, completed it 8 times, and won stage 5 between Avranches and Évreux in 1993. He is one of the relatively few riders to have won stages in all three major tours (Tour de France, Giro d'Italia and Vuelta a España), and the only Dane. In March 1993 Skibby suffered a double fracture of the skull during a crash in the bunch sprint of stage 5 of Tirreno–Adriatico, however he made a remarkable recovery and was back racing later that year.

Skibby won the Tour of Holland stage race in 1994 after an epic breakaway on the last stage, as well as numerous individual stages in other races. In the 1987 Tour of Flanders, he was leading the race when his bike got driven over by a race director car climbing the Koppenberg, resulting in a deformed wheel. As a result, the Koppenberg got taken out of the route of the Tour of Flanders for 17 years before returning in 2004 with improved rider safety.

Personal life

In 2005 he participated in the television show Vild Med Dans (Dancing with the Stars).

In August 2013 he participated in the television show Doping Epidemien (Doping Epidemics) where he told about the consequences of using doping for more than 10 years.

His sister is Olympic cyclist Karina Skibby and his father is Olympic cyclist Willy Skibby.

Doping
In November 2006, he released his autobiography, in which he confesses to having used doping for more than 10 years. In 1991 he started using steroids, in 1992 growth hormones and testosterone, and in 1993 he was also using EPO. He claims that he requested the drugs himself, and he does not name any other riders or contacts in the book.

Major results

1986
 3rd Trofeo Baracchi
 5th Grand Prix of Aargau Canton
1987
 1st Stage 1b Danmark Rundt
 9th Overall Tour Méditerranéen
 9th Scheldeprijs
1988
 1st Stage 5a Danmark Rundt
 2nd Grand Prix de la Libération
 4th Grand Prix Pino Cerami
1989
 1st Grand Prix de la Libération
 1st Stage 19 Giro d'Italia
 4th Overall Tirreno–Adriatico
1990
 Tour de la Communauté Européenne
1st Stages 3 & 10 (ITT)
 7th Milan–San Remo
 7th Paris–Brussels
 10th Grand Prix of Aargau Canton
1991
 Vuelta a España
1st Stage 3 & 7 
 2nd Overall Vuelta a Andalucía
 5th Overall Ronde van Nederland
 6th Overall Tirreno–Adriatico
1st Stage 7 
 6th Grand Prix Pino Cerami
 7th Overall Tour de Luxembourg
 7th Tour of Flanders
1992
 2nd Trofeo Luis Puig
 8th Tour of Flanders
1993
 1st Stage 5 Tour de France
 2nd Wincanton Classic
 4th Giro di Campania
 6th Giro di Lombardia
 7th Overall Ronde van Nederland
1st Stage 5 
 9th Overall Tour Méditerranéen
 9th Paris–Tours
1994
 1st  Overall Ronde van Nederland
1st Stage 5
 1st Stage 4 Tirreno–Adriatico
 Vuelta Asturias
1st Stages 1 & 6 
 5th Grote Prijs Jef Scherens
 5th Coppa Sabatini
 6th Brabantse Pijl
1995
 1st Stage 9 Vuelta a España
 Danmark Rundt
1st Stages 2 & 5 
 5th Amstel Gold Race
 6th Tour of Flanders
 9th Milan–San Remo
1996
 3rd Road race, National Road Championships
 3rd Clásica de Almería
 6th Overall Danmark Rundt
1st Stage 4a 
 7th Coppa Sabatini
 7th Coppa Placci
 10th Overall Ronde van Nederland
1997
 3rd Overall Danmark Rundt
1998
 1st Omloop der Vlaamse Ardennen
1999
 1st Circuito de Getxo
 1st Stage 5 Tour de Luxembourg
 2nd Time trial, National Road Championships
 2nd Overall Tour Down Under
 2nd Overall Tour of Sweden
1st Stage 3 
 2nd Grand Prix Eddy Merckx (with Marc Streel)
 4th Overall Tour du Limousin
 7th GP Herning
2000
 7th Brabantse Pijl

Grand Tour general classification results timeline

See also
 List of sportspeople sanctioned for doping offences
 List of doping cases in cycling

References

External links 

Official Tour de France results for Jesper Skibby

1964 births
Living people
Danish male cyclists
Danish sportspeople in doping cases
Danish Tour de France stage winners
Danish Giro d'Italia stage winners
Doping cases in cycling
Cyclists at the 1996 Summer Olympics
Olympic cyclists of Denmark
Danish Vuelta a España stage winners
People from Silkeborg
Sportspeople from the Central Denmark Region